Carmel School is a private unaided school located in Padmanabhanagar, Bangalore, India. The school was founded by A. F. Kudroli who is also the school's chairman. The school provides education starting from Pre Nursery to 10th std. It follows the ICSE scheme until 7th standard. From 8th standard, students can choose between ICSE and State streams. The school has multiple libraries, yoga hall, computer labs, science and math labs, one auditorium, and activity rooms.

The school has a tiled field for sports such as basketball, volleyball, throw ball, and other sports. The school also conducts annual cricket selections for the school Cricket Team. The School conducts many co-curricular activities such as debate, elocution, singing, inquisition, skit, dance, science exhibitions and many more. There are 42 school buses for the transport of the children to and from the school. Every day, it holds a special assembly to provide an initial stage for talents, usually followed by a speech from the principal of the respective school division. The school conducts annual talent show known as Spandana. Every year the school dedicates a day for sports known as the Sports Day.

The school has celebrated its Silver Jubilee in November 2011.

Sister Institutions
Clarence Public School, J.P. Nagar
Florence Public Schooll, R. T. Nagar
Greenfield Public School, Jakkur, Bangalore.

Primary schools in Karnataka
High schools and secondary schools in Bangalore
Private schools in Bangalore
Educational institutions established in 1986
1986 establishments in Karnataka